Ricky Koole (born 11 September 1972) is a Dutch singer and film actress. She appeared in more than forty films since 1996.

Personal life and career
Koole graduated in 1995 with a Bachelor of the Arts from the Kleinkunstacademie in Amsterdam. She has appeared in numerous TV series and films, and was nominated for several prizes including the prestigious Gouden Kalf. She creates theater shows focused on music, including several solo shows and collaborations with other musicians and with her partner Leo Blokhuis. As a singer and songwriter she has released multiple albums, including New Orleans Live, Ricky Koole with Ocobar, No Use Crying and Wind Om Het Huis.

Koole married Leo Blokhuis in 2012 and together they have a son.

Selected filmography

References

External links

Dutch film actresses
1972 births
Living people
People from Delft
20th-century Dutch actresses